Paigah family is a noble family of Hyderabad State and include Amirs who held the honorary morchal (standard) behind the Nizam. The family maintained their own court, individual palaces, and a standing army of about fourteen thousand troops, both infantry and cavalry.

History 
The word Paigah, which means pomp and rank in Persian, was a title given by the second Nizam of Hyderabad to Nawab Abul Fateh Taig Jung Bahadur in appreciation of the royal services rendered by him. The Nawab was also conferred with the titles of Shams-ul-Umra, Shams-ul-Mulk Shams-ud-Daula Shams-ul-Umra which Means "The Sun among Nobles" and he became the founder of the Paigah family.

Shaikh Muhammad Bahauddin, who was Governor of Shikohabad under Mughal Emperor Aurangzeb, was the twelfth direct descendant of Shaikh Fariduddin Ganjshakar a saint of the Indian subcontinent (now in Punjab, Pakistan), whose linage is traced up to Omar bin Al-Khattab, the second Caliph of Islam.

Abul Khair Khan, son of Shaikh Muhammad Bahauddin, was in the service of Mughal Emperor Muhammad Shah. During this time, he was bestowed the title of Khan Bahadur. His statesmanship was noticed by Nizam-ul-Mulk (the then Prime Minister of Mughal, and later founder of Asaf Jahi dynasty and known as Nizam I) and was appointed as Deputy Governor of Malwa and Khandesh. He joined Nizam on his way to Deccan and accompanied him in the battles against Maratha. During Nizam I's campaign to Delhi in the process to negotiate and stop Nadir Shah, Khan safeguarded his Nizamat in Deccan and overthrow rebellion by his son Salabat Jung. During his career under Nizam I, he was appointed as Qila Dar of Dhar (1724), Faujdar of Nabinagar, Mandu (1724), and later elevated up to Naib Subadar-Deputy Governor Khandesh and Aurangabad. He died in 1952 and was buried in Burhanpur. His titles are Khan Bahadur, Shamsher Bahadur, and Imam Jang I.

Abul Khair Khan had two sons, his first Abul Barakat Khan Imam Jung II was shot to death during lifetime of his father while inspecting the fort near Poona, which was captured from Maratha; he is buried in Burhanpur. His second son Abul Fateh Khan joined the services of Nizam II and was regarded as the head of Paigah. Paigah family. Appointed to a mansab of 7,000 zat and 5000, sowar 1777, prom. to 9,000 sowar and a Paigah contingent of 12,000 troops 1781.Received the Naubat, Naqara and Mahi Maratib (ensigns of royalty). Constructed Nai Haveli 1201H (1782 AD). Abul Fatah Khan died at Pongel while on his way to face Tipu Sultan during the 2nd Mysore War on 1 January 1791. Abul Fatah Khan was interred at Paigah tombs beside dargah of Beranashah Saheb. His titles at the time of his death were: Abul Fateh Khan, Abul Khair Khan II, Tegh Jung, Shums-ud-Dowlah, Shums-ul-Mulk, Shums-ul-Umara I. He was survived by his son Muhammad Fakhruddin Khan and daughter Bibi Najeeba.(Commanded Battles: Battle of Udgir 1760 AD against Balaji Baji Rao Peshwa III,accompanied Nizam Ali Khan Asaf Jah II in all his campaigns,Commanded Campaign Adoni against Tipu Sultan 1200 H (1781 AD), Battle of Nirmal 1783 AD against Ehtasham Jung (Zafar ud Dowla Dhaunsa).

After Abul Fateh's death in 1791, his son Fakhruddin Khan inherited the estates and titles. He was given the title Amir-e-Kabir, which meant Head of the Nobles. He also married the daughter of Asaf Jah II, Sahebzadi Bashirunissa Begum in 1797. Thus began the tradition of marrying the Nizam's daughters to young men of the Paigah family.
Fakhruddin Khan's grandson through his third son was Sir Asman Jah, Jah had one son Moin-Ud-Dowlah Bahadur Asman Jah who had 14 sons and 7 daughter, Fakhruddin Khan's fourth son Rasheeduddin Khan had two sons, Viqar-ul-Umra and Khurshid Jah.

Nawab Iqbal Uddin Khan son of Nawab Moin-Ud-Daula Bahadur Asman Jahi  married to the saehbzadi Ahmed unisa begum menternal grand daughter of H.H Mahboob Ali Khan and perantal grand daughter of Sultan ul-Mulk,Viqar-ul-Umrahi Iqtidar ud-Daula, their son Sahebzade Nawab Muhaammed Hyder uddin Khan is member of both Asaf Jahi dynasty and Paigah Family

Bashir Yar Jung, a grandson of Viqar-ul-Umra married Saleha Sultan, the daughter of Sajida Sultan and Iftikhar Ali Khan Pataudi. Their son Saad Bin Jung is a member of the Paigah family as well as Pataudi Royal Family.

Family and Amir's 
At the death of Fakhruddin Khan, the Paigah estate was divided between his two sons that had surviving issue: Rafiuddin Khan and Rashiduddin Khan. Rafiuddin Khan's titles at the time of death were: Abul Khair Khan IV, Namwar Jung, Umdat-ud-Doula, Shums-ud-Doula, Umdat-ul-Mulk, Shums-ul-Umara III, Amir-e-Kabir II. Rashiduddin Khan's titles at the time of his death were: Abul Khair Khan V, Bahadur Jung, Iqtidar-ud-Doula, Shums-ud-Doula, Iqtidar-ul-Mulk, Shums-ul-Mulk, Shums-ul-Umara IV, Viqar-ul-Umara I, Amir-e-Kabir III.

When Rafiuddin Khan died in 1877, his Paigah estate was inherited by his two adopted sons Sabaqat Jung (1839–1880) and Sir Asman Jah(1840–1898). However, when Sabaqat Jung died in 1880 without issue, his portion of the Paigah estate was divided into three parts and allocated between his brother Sir Asman Jah and his cousins Sir Khurshid Jah and Sir Viqar-ul-Umra. When Rashiduddin Khan died in 1881, his share of the Paigah estate was divided between his two sons Sir Khurshid Jah Bahadur (1841–1902) and Sir Viqar-ul-Umara Bahadur II (1856–1902). It was decided during this period that there would be no further divisions of the three estates. The Paigah estates were henceforth known as the Asman Jahi Paigah, Khursheed Jahi Paigah, and Viqar-ul-Umarahi Paigah.

Each of the three branches has its own Amir, appointed by the Nizam entirely at his own discretion. Preference was given to individuals whose mothers were daughters of the Nizam, provided that they were fit for the post, regardless of other seniority factors such as age. The newly appointed Amir would inherit the entire jaagir of the previous Amir and would be the ceremonial head of that branch of the Paigah family. The Nizam also had the authority to appoint one Amir from among the three Paigah Amirs to hold the honorary morchal (standard) behind the Nizam during Durbar.

According to the census of 1901, the three Paigah Estates in the Hyderabad State comprised 23 taluks dispersed over the districts of Bidar, Nander, Osmanabad, Gulbarga, Medak, Atraf-i-Balda, and Nizamabad, and a few scattered villages in Aurangabad, Warangal, Mahbubnagar, and Nalgonda, encompassing 1,273 villages, covering 4,134 square miles, over a population of 774,411 (The Imperial Gazetteer of India, vol. 1, 1909).

Family tree

Asman Jah, Amir e Akbar, Nawab Sir Muhammad Mazhar ud-din Khan Bahadur son of Nawab Sultanuddin Khan (served as Prime Minister of Hyderabad)
Amir-e-Paigah-e-Asman Jahi, Moin-ud-Daula Bahadur Asman Jah Innayat Jung, Nawab Muhammad Moin uddin Khan Bahadur
Viqar ul Umra II, Iqtedar-ul-Mulk, Iqbal-ud-Dowla, Sikandar Jung Amir e Paigah, Nawab Sir Muhammad Fazl ud-din Khan Bahadur (served as Prime Minister of Hyderabad1893 to 1901).
Nawab Fareed Nawaz Jung Bahadur(Third son of Nawab Sultan ul Mulk) Married to Princess Sahibzadi Ghous unnisa Begum (Daughter of Mir Mahboob Ali Khan *Asaf Jah VI Nizam) Their Daughter is member of both Nizam And Paigah 
Nawabzada Muhammad Saad Bin Jung

Relationship with the Nizams
The bond between the Nizams and the Paigah nobility strengthened with the marriage of Abul Fatah Khan's son Fakhruddin Khan with the daughter of Mir Nizam Ali Khan, Asaf Jah II, Sahebzadi Bashirunissa Begum in 1797. Henceforth, Fakhruddin Khan's descendants married daughters of other Nizams and consequently, in protocol, the Paigahs were considered next only to the Nizams. The Paigah jagir was the largest in the state, second only to the Nizam.

The Paigah nobility, being sons-in-law and brothers-in-law to the Nizams, were to a certain extent above the law. The local police and courts did not have personal or in rem jurisdiction over their persons or property. They were subject only to the jurisdiction of the Nizam.

Tombs 

The Paigah Tombs are the tombs belonging to the nobility of Paigah family. They were constructed over a period of time during the 18th, 19th and 20th centuries. They are located in the Santoshnagar locality of Hyderabad. The tombs are made of lime and mortar with beautiful inlaid marble carvings.

Places Named after the Paigah family 
Vikarabad, a town in Telangana, is named after H.E Viqar-ul-Umra, and the town of Shamshabad, which houses the Rajiv Gandhi International Airport, is also named after The Shams-ul-umra family. Moinabad was named after Nawab Moin-Ud-Daula Bahadur Asman Jahi. The area of Begumpet was gifted to the Paigah family, when Abul Fateh Khan's son Fakhr uddin Khan was married to the daughter of Nizam Ali Khan, Asaf Jah II Sahebzadi Bashirunissa Begum. Basheerbagh is named after H E Sir Asman Jah Bahadur Basheer ud Daula.

Zaheerabad in Telangana is named after Nawab Zahir Yar Jung, Amir e Paigah Asman Jah.

Paigah Deodis
The Paigah noblemen were known for their residences, usually known as Devdis. Bashir Bagh Palace belonged to Sir Asman Jah, a Paigah Amir and Prime Minister of Hyderabad (1887–1893). Sir Vicar-ul-Umra, the Paigah Amir and the then prime minister of Hyderabad state 1894–1901 (also officiated as prime minister in 1893) presented Falaknuma palace in 1897, easily one of the most opulent palaces in the country, to the sixth Nizam, Mir Mahbub Ali Khan.

Other important Paigah Palaces were:
 
Asman Garh Palace
Paigah Palace
Khursheed Jah Devdi
Vikhar Manzil
Devdi Iqbal ud-Dowla
Basheer Bagh Palace

See also
Falaknuma Palace
Paigah Tombs
Chiraan Fort Palace

References

External links
The Hindu feature
The Hindu feature on Paigah palace
Timesofindia.indiatimes on Basheerbagh Palace
People from Hyderabad State
Indian noble families